Ross's Calayan gecko (Gekko rossi) is a species of lizard in the family Gekkonidae. The species is endemic to Calayan Island in the Philippines.

Etymology
The specific name, rossi, is in honor of herpetologist Charles Andrew "Andy" Ross.

Description
Females are smaller at  maximum SVL.

References

Further reading
Brown, Rafe M.; Oliveros, Carl; Siler, Cameron D.; Diesmos, Arvin C. (2009). "Phylogeny of Gekko from the Northern Philippines, and Description of a New Species from Calayan Island". Journal of Herpetology 43 (4): 620–635. (Gekko rossi, new species).

Gekko
Reptiles described in 2009
Endemic fauna of the Philippines
Reptiles of the Philippines